Joseph P. Ritz (6 November 1929 – 4 January 2016) was an author, playwright and journalist in Buffalo, New York.

Early life and education
Ritz was born in Chicago, Illinois. His natural parents are unknown. He was adopted by Joseph Ritz (originally Rizzi) and his wife, Helen, and raised in Canton, Ohio.  He graduated from Catholic grade school and Central Catholic High School there. He joined the Army in 1948, was stationed in Fort Lewis, Wash., and was deployed to Fort Richardson, Alaska, near Anchorage, after the start of the Korean War. He had his first newspaper article – a feature story on Army ski exercises – published in the Tacoma Tribune while he was at Fort Lewis. In Alaska, he joined the Anchorage Writers Club.

Following his discharge, he attended Seattle University and worked as a hopper for the Seattle Times. delivering bundles of newspapers to stores. After a year, he transferred to Marquette University, where he majored in journalism, was an associate editor of the Marquette Journal, the student magazine; and worked part-time as a copy boy for the Milwaukee Sentinel when it was a Hearst newspaper. He graduated from Marquette with a bachelor's degree in journalism in February 1955.

Career
Ritz's first job out of college was as a news writer for Radio Station WFDF in Flint, Michigan. He also was a stringer for the Detroit Times and United Press. He went on to become a reporter for the Gloversville Leader-Herald, the New Haven Journal-Courier and the Newburgh Evening News. In the early 1960s he also was assistant news director for Fordham University. At the Newburgh Evening News, he wrote part of a news series entitled The Road to Integration that won a 1964 Pulitzer Citation for Public Service for the Gannett Group of newspapers.

In 1964, he went to The Buffalo Courier-Express, where he was a reporter, copy editor and editorial writer at different times until the paper went out of business in September 1982. He then was an education, business and labor writer for The Buffalo News. His weekly column on labor unions earned him several awards. He retired in 1993.

In retirement, he continued to write freelance. His articles appeared in the New York Sun, The New York Herald-Tribune, The London Express and the National Catholic Reporter.

He died in Hamburg, NY, on 4 January 2016. He was survived by his wife of 57 years, Ann; five children and eight grandchildren.

Books and plays
Ritz authored the books The Despised Poor: Newburgh's War on Welfare and I Never Looked for My Mother and Other Regrets of a Journalist.

His plays include: Copy Desk (performed in Buffalo and Los Angeles) Trappists (performed several times in NYC and published in an anthology entitled ''Incisions – Award Winning Plays from the Stage & Screen Book Club; The Harvest Years, I.R.S. and Mark & Livy.

Awards and recognition
Among prizes for his newspaper articles were the New York State Publishers' Award for Community Service, The New York State AFL-CIO 1986 Award "for outstanding achievements and contributions on behalf of working men and women in the state," the American Political Science Association's Award for "Distinguished Reporting of Public Affairs" and the U.S. Department of Labor Award in 1988 for "outstanding efforts to advance the welfare of American's working men and women."

References

20th-century American dramatists and playwrights
Writers from Ohio
2016 deaths
1929 births